Kalininskyi, known officially as Kundriuche since 2016, is an urban-type settlement in Dovzhansk Raion (district) in Luhansk Oblast of eastern Ukraine. Population:

Demographics
Native language distribution as of the Ukrainian Census of 2001:
 Ukrainian: 25.89%
 Russian: 72.25%
 Others 1.86%

References

Urban-type settlements in Dovzhansk Raion